Víctor Miguel Tomás Latou Jaume (30 April 1913 – 12 December 2002) was an Uruguayan basketball player. He competed in the 1936 Summer Olympics.

References

External links

1913 births
2002 deaths
Uruguayan men's basketball players
Olympic basketball players of Uruguay
Basketball players at the 1936 Summer Olympics
Sportspeople from Montevideo